Arab and Jew: Wounded Spirits in a Promised Land, written by David K. Shipler and published by Times Books in 1986, won the 1987 Pulitzer Prize for General Non-Fiction. It was adapted as a documentary for PBS in 1989 by Robert H. Gardner.

References

External links
 

1986 non-fiction books
Pulitzer Prize for General Non-Fiction-winning works
Times Books books